Kjell Frisk (born 27 April 1964) is a Swedish former professional footballer who played as a goalkeeper. Frisk made 24 Allsvenskan appearances for Djurgården.

References

External links
  

1964 births
Living people
Association football goalkeepers
Swedish footballers
Allsvenskan players
Åtvidabergs FF players
Djurgårdens IF Fotboll players